There are several Acts named Statute of Westminster Adoption Act:

 Statute of Westminster Adoption Act 1942, an Act of the Parliament of Australia
 Statute of Westminster Adoption Act 1947, a constitutional Act of the Parliament of New Zealand

See also
 Statute of Westminster (disambiguation)